HMS Delphinium  was an  sloop launched in 1915. During World War I, Delphinium  was operated by the Royal Navy as a minesweeper and escort, based in Queenstown. She escorted merchant vessels and was involved in rescuing the crews of two merchant ships sunk by German submarines. Delphinium paid out in 1919, but was re-commissioned in Chatham on 18 December 1928 for duty in the Africa Station until 1932. During this time Delphinium made duty calls to a number of African countries and in 1929, hosted the Christy Commission of the League of Nations, during its work in Liberia. Delphinium was sold for scrap on 13 October 1933.

Design and construction

Delphinium was one of 36 Arabis-class sloops ordered and laid down in 1915  for the Royal Navy during World War I. The class were intended for minesweeping duties in European waters, but Delphinium also performed duties as a merchant vessel escort.

Delphinium had a displacement of 1,250 tons. The propulsion system consisted of a four-cylinder triple expansion engine, connected to a single propeller shaft.

Delphinium was laid down for the Royal Navy by  Napier and Miller, Glasgow, Scotland, 1 July 1915 and launched on 23 December 1915.

Service history

1915 to 1919 
During  World War I, Delphinium was stationed in Queenstown as a minesweeper and merchant vessel escort. Initially Delphinium was part of the 3rd Sloop Flotilla, but in December 1918, Delphinium was assigned to the 23rd Fleet Sweeping Flotilla operating  from Buncrana. On 1 April 1917, Delphinium escorted the RFA Boxleaf, an Emergency Wartime Construction (LEAF) oiler tanker in the Irish Sea. On 28 April 1917, German submarine  stopped the merchant ship Anne Marie. The crew were ordered to leave the ship before it was sunk, were taken aboard Delphinium 18  hours later and brought to Queenstown. On 31 August 1917, Delphinium entered Lough Swilly harbour, Buncrana, towing US tanker SS Albert Watts.On 2 October 1917, German submarine  torpedoed the armoured cruiser , causing it to lose the use of its steam steering gear. Drake subsequently collided with cargo ship Mendip Range, eventually sinking in Church Bay near Rathlin Island. Delphinium and the destroyer  came alongside to remove the crew.Delphinium paid out in Queenstown, 23 July 1919.

 1920 to 1925 
Delphinium held in depot in Devonport.

 1925 to 1932 
After 1926, Delphinium was re-commissioned several times and each time assigned to duty in the Africa Station. During her service, Delphinium worked primarily along the west coast of Africa, with documented stops in Monrovia (Liberia), South Knysna and  Simonstown (Africa), Limbé (Cameroon, then called Victoria in the British Cameroons), the Canary Islands, Opobo and Lagos (Nigeria).

In 1929,  Delphinium hosted aboard a League of Nations Commission of Enquiry (the Christy Commission). The Commission of Enquiry was investigating allegations of modern slavery on the island of Fernando Po linked to Liberia. Delphinium anchored in the open roadstead in Monrovia, Liberia, there being no port at that time.

In 1932, Delphinium visited Knysna, South Africa and a crew detail was sent ashore to polish the brass and clip the grass on the grave of  “Bondi”, the ship's dog mascot of  HMS Verbena (1915).

In 1932, Delphinium was recalled and sailed from Simonstown, South Africa to England

Decommissioning and fateDelphinium'' paid off 7 March 1933 and was sold for scrap to Rees Metals Ltd., Llanelli, 13 October 1933.

References

External links
 HMS Delphinium (1915)

World War I sloops of the United Kingdom
Arabis-class sloops
Ships built on the River Clyde
1915 ships